The Egypt women's national basketball team is the nationally controlled basketball team representing Egypt at world basketball competitions for women.

Results

African Championship
Egypt women's national basketball team won the FIBA Africa Championship for Women in 1966 and 1968 and came second in 1970 as the United Arab Republic. In the 1974 championship Egypt won third place and they were the runner up in 1977 championship. More recently they came seventh in 2000

1966 – 1st
1968 – 1st
1970 – 2nd
1974 – 3rd
1977 – 2nd
1984 – 6th
1990 – 7th
2000 – 7th
2013 – 8th
2015 – 8th
2017 – 7th
2019 – 7th
2021 – 6th
2023 – Qualified

Pan-Arab games
Egypt's team was the runner-up in 2011, winning four matches and losing only to Lebanon.

All Africa Games
Egypt women's team won three bronze medals in Basketball at the All-Africa Games.

Current roster
Roster for the 2021 Women's Afrobasket.

See also
Egypt women's national under-19 basketball team
Egypt women's national under-17 basketball team

References

External links

FIBA profile
Africabasket: Egypt women national team
Egypt Basketball Records at FIBA Archive

Basketball in Egypt
Basketball teams in Egypt
Women's national basketball teams
Basketball
Women's sport in Egypt